Aglaura is a monotypic genus of deep-sea hydrozoan in the family Rhopalonematidae. It is represented by the species Aglaura hemistoma. It has a cosmopolitan distribution in tropical to temperate oceans.

References

Rhopalonematidae
Cnidarians of the Atlantic Ocean
Cnidarians of the Indian Ocean
Cnidarians of the Pacific Ocean
Animals described in 1810
Taxa named by Charles Alexandre Lesueur
Taxa named by François Péron